Baudette Air Force Station is a closed United States Air Force General Surveillance Radar station. It was closed in 1979.

History
Baudette Air Force Station was initially part of Phase II of the Air Defense Command Mobile Radar program. The Air Force  approved this expansion of the Mobile Radar program on October 23, 1952.  Radars in this network were designated “SM.”

The station became operational on 1 October 1958 when the 692d Aircraft Control and Warning Squadron began operating an AN/FPS-3 and a pair of AN/FPS-6 height-finder radars, and initially the station functioned as a Ground-Control Intercept (GCI) and warning station.  As a GCI station, the squadron's role was to guide interceptor aircraft toward unidentified intruders picked up on the unit's radar scopes.

During 1959 Baudette AFS joined the Semi Automatic Ground Environment (SAGE) system, feeding data to DC-10 at Duluth IAP, Minnesota. After joining, the squadron was redesignated as the 692d Radar Squadron (SAGE) on 15 December 1959.   The radar squadron provided information around the clock to the SAGE Direction Center where it was analyzed to determine range, direction altitude speed and whether or not aircraft were friendly or hostile.

In 1962 Baudette received an AN/FPS-24 search radar, and during 1963 an AN/FPS-26A height-finder radar was installed, replacing one AN/FPS-6, and the other AN/FPS-6 height-finder radar was upgraded to an AN/FPS-90. On 31 July 1963, the site was redesignated as NORAD ID Z-132.

In addition to the main facility, Baudette operated the following AN/FPS-18 Gap Filler sites:
 Big Falls, MN     (SM-132A) 
 Middle River, MN  (SM-132B) 

Over the years, the equipment at the station was upgraded or modified to improve the efficiency and accuracy of the information gathered by the radars.  The AN/FPS-90 height-finder radar was retired in late 1971.

The 692nd Radar Sq was inactivated and replaced by the 692d Air Defense Group in March 1970.   The upgrade to group status was done because of Baudette AFS' status as a Backup Interceptor Control (BUIC) site. BUIC sites were alternate control sites in case SAGE Direction Centers became disabled and unable to control interceptor aircraft. The group was awarded the Air Force Outstanding Unit Award for exceptionally meritorious service for the period 1 June 1971 through 31 May 1973 The group was inactivated and replaced by the 692nd Radar Squadron as defenses against manned bombers were reduced. The group was disbanded in 1984.  The 692d Radar Squadron was inactivated on 1 July 1979 as part of the phase-down of Aerospace Defense Command.

Today, the former Baudette Air Force Station is a cold-weather automobile test facility used by Acura.  Many USAF buildings remain and in use and the station is well maintained, along with the large AN/FPS-24 search radar tower.

Air Force units and assignments

Units
 Constituted as 692nd Aircraft Control and Warning Squadron
 Activated at Snelling AFS, Minnesota, 8 August 1958 (not manned or equipped)
 Moved to Baudette AFS on 1 October 1958
 Redesignated 692nd Radar Squadron (SAGE) on 15 December 1959
 Inactivated on 1 March 1970
 Redesignated 692nd Radar Squadron on 1 January 1974
 Activated on 17 January 1974
 Inactivated on 1 July 1979
 Constituted as 692nd Air Defense Group on 13 February 1970
 Activated on 1 March 1970
 Inactivated on 17 January 1974
 Disbanded on 27 September 1984

Awards

Commanders
 Lt Col. B.E. Thayer, 1 March 1970 - 1970
 Lt Col. Walter M. Adcock, 1970 - unknown
 Lt Col Carl A. Lindberg, 30 August 1961 - 3 August 1963 Source: That Officer's AF Form 11 (supplied by his oldest son, Carl A. Lindberg Jr.).

Assignments
 31st Air Division, 1 October 1958
 37th Air Division, 1 January 1959
 30th Air Division, 1 April 1959
 Duluth Air Defense Sector, 1 July 1959
 29th Air Division, 1 April 1966
 23d Air Division, 19 November 1969 - 1 July 1979

See also
 List of USAF Aerospace Defense Command General Surveillance Radar Stations
 List of United States Air Force aircraft control and warning squadrons

References

Notes

Bibliography

 
 AF Pamphlet 900-2, Unit Decorations, Awards and Campaign Participation Credits, Vol II Department of the Air Force, Washington, DC, 30 Sep 76

Further reading

External links
 

Installations of the United States Air Force in Minnesota
Semi-Automatic Ground Environment sites
Aerospace Defense Command military installations
1958 establishments in Minnesota
1979 disestablishments in Minnesota
Military installations established in 1958
Military installations closed in 1979